WFNS (1350 kHz) is an AM radio station licensed to Blackshear, Georgia, United States.  The station is currently owned by William Dorminy, through licensee Southern Media Interactive LLC.

History
The station went on the air as WIEZ on 1983-06-27. On 1983-12-25, the station changed its call sign to WGIA, on 2000-05-04 to WXRB, and on 2001-07-24 to the current WFNS,

On September 4, 2022, it was announced that Shanks Broadcasting will acquire WFNS and will begin carrying the company's "Sports Superstations" network.

References

External links

FNS
Radio stations established in 1983